Gerhard Hessenberg (16 August 1874 – 16 November 1925) was a German mathematician who worked in projective geometry, differential geometry, and set theory.

Career
Hessenberg received his Ph.D. from the University of Berlin in 1899 under the guidance of Hermann Schwarz and Lazarus Fuchs.

His name is usually associated with projective geometry, where he is known for proving that Desargues' theorem is a consequence of Pappus's hexagon theorem, and differential geometry where he is known for introducing the concept of a connection. He was also a set theorist: the Hessenberg sum and product of ordinals are named after him.  However, Hessenberg matrices are named for Karl Hessenberg, a near relative.

In 1908 Gerhard Hessenberg was an Invited Speaker of the International Congress of Mathematicians in Rome.

Publications

 (also in book form as a separate publication from Verlag Vandenhoeck und Ruprecht, Göttingen 1906).

 (unaltered reprint of the Teubner edition of 1912).

Notes

External links

1874 births
1925 deaths
19th-century German mathematicians
20th-century German mathematicians
Geometers